Yang Maolin is a noted contemporary Taiwanese artist.

Born in 1953 in Changhua, Taiwan, Yang studied painting at the Chinese Culture University in Taipei. He co-founded several artists groups linked to the Transavantgarde movement in Taiwan: 101 and the Taipei Group in the 1980s, and Hantooshe in the late 1990s. He is chiefly known for his politically charged paintings of the 1980s, and his decade-long investigation into the political, the historical and cultural aspects of Taiwanese identity during the 1990s. After the turn of the millennium he started to explore sculpture, blending buddhist iconology with manga icons.  

Beyond numerous museum shows in Taiwan and Asia, he participated three times at the Venice Biennale: in 1999 he took part in the collateral event VOC- Handle with Care, in 2009 he staged his solo show Temple of Sublime Beauty, Made in Taiwan and in 2011 he participated at Future Pass.

See also
Taiwanese art

References

External links
Yang Maolin´s Temple of Sublime Beauty, Made in Taiwan exhibition in Venice 2009
Yang Maolin, Temple of Sublime Beauty, Made in Taiwan, exhibition catalogue, Taipei, Venice 2009
53. Biennale Länderpavillions, Taiwan: Yang Maolin, Temple of Sublime Beauty
Halleluja: Temple of Sublime Beauty, Made in Taiwan, catalogue, Taipei 2009
Yang Maolin. Future Pass - Part 1 Yang Maolin at the Future Pass exhibition in Venice 2011
Yang Mao-Lin official website 

Living people
1953 births
Taiwanese artists